Benoni is the original name of the biblical Benjamin. It is the given name of:

 Benoni Aubert (1768–1832), Norwegian surveyor and soldier
 Benoni Beheyt (born 1940), Belgian former road bicycle racer
 Benoni Danks (c. 1710–1776), officer in the French and Indian War and member of the Nova Scotia House of Assembly
 Benoni d'Entremont (c. 1745–1841), mariner, shipbuilder, office holder, justice of the peace and militia officer in Nova Scotia
 Benoni S. Fuller (1825–1903), American politician
 Benoni Hall (1710–1779), Rhode Island surveyor and justice of the Colonial Rhode Island Supreme Court
 Benoni Irwin (1840–1896), American portrait painter
 Benoni Ogwal (born 1942), Anglican bishop in Uganda
 Benoni Reynolds (1824–1911), American politician
 Benoni Urey (born 1957), Americo-Liberian businessman and politician
 Benoni Whitten (died 1883), American attorney and Oregon Supreme Court associate justice

Masculine given names